Rienzi may refer to

Culture
 Rienzi (play), the 1828 Tragedy in Five Acts by Mary Mitford.
 Rienzi, the Last of the Roman Tribunes, the 1835 novel by Edward Bulwer-Lytton 
 Rienzi, an opera by Richard Wagner based on the above
 Rienzi (Hunt painting), full title Rienzi vowing to obtain justice for the death of his young brother, slain in a skirmish between the Colonna and the Orsini factions, a painting by English artist William Holman Hunt

People
 Cola di Rienzo, an Italian medieval politician and popular leader
 Adrian Cola Rienzi (1905-1972), a Trinidad and Tobago lawyer, politician and labour leader

Other
 Rienzi, Mississippi, a town in the United States
 The horse of American Civil War general Philip Sheridan, named after a battle in the above town